Valeriy Pereshkura (born 20 September 1977) is a Ukrainian gymnast. He competed at the 2000 Summer Olympics winning a silver medal in the men's artistic team all-around event.

References

External links
 

1977 births
Living people
Ukrainian male artistic gymnasts
Olympic gymnasts of Ukraine
Gymnasts at the 2000 Summer Olympics
Sportspeople from Krasnoyarsk
Medalists at the 2000 Summer Olympics
Olympic medalists in gymnastics
Olympic silver medalists for Ukraine